The granite dwarf gecko (Lygodactylus graniticolus) is a species of gecko endemic to the Limpopo Province in South Africa.

References

Lygodactylus
Reptiles described in 1992
Endemic reptiles of South Africa